MAX is a men's magazine published in several European countries, including Italy, France, Germany, Greece, and Spain, as well as in Australia. In France, MAX was published from 1989 to 2006.

Theme 
Max magazine targeted to a male audience, and portrayed as a male counterpart of women's magazines, not hesitating to use provocation, shock titles and bare photos.

In February 2008, Max Italia republished a fashion editorial of Carla Bruni-Sarkozy in Lionel Cros and Thierry Mugler futuristic and sexy outfits, shot by Philippe Robert for Harper's Bazaar Italia  in 1991, and first published in the magazine's several European editions in 1992.

Melania Knauss, who would later become the wife of Donald Trump, appeared in the magazine's January 1996 issue.

References

1989 establishments in France
2008 disestablishments in France
Defunct magazines published in France
Men's magazines published in France
Magazines established in 1989
Magazines disestablished in 2008
French-language magazines